The sixth series of the children's television series Hi-5 aired between 18 October 2004 and 26 November 2004 on the Nine Network in Australia. The series was produced by Kids Like Us for Nine with Helena Harris as executive producer. The series serves as a "best of" collection, compiling segments which originally aired as part of the fourth and fifth series, while debuting new songs of the week. The series debuted simultaneously in Australia and the United Kingdom.

Cast

Presenters
 Kellie Crawford – Word Play
 Kathleen de Leon Jones – Puzzles and Patterns
 Nathan Foley – Shapes in Space
 Tim Harding – Making Music
 Charli Robinson  – Body Move

Episodes

Home video releases

Awards and nominations

References

External links
 Hi-5 Website

2004 Australian television seasons